Dr Mukesh Batra (born 1 July 1951) is the founder of Dr Batra's group of companies, a chain of homeopathy clinics in 6 countries and an FMCG brand. He is a first generation entrepreneur, the author of books on homeopathy, and writer of health columns in publications such as The Times of India. He was awarded the Padma Shri award for homeopathic medicine in 2012. Dr. Mukesh Batra is widely known for using modern technology to bring standardization to "homeopathic healthcare solutions". He is regarded by some as the pioneer of modern homeopathy in India. He started the World's first branded and computerized homeopathy clinic in 1982. He also introduced the blister-packaging of homeopathic remedies.

Dr Batra's was mentioned in the Limca Book of Records (Editions 2004 and 2005) for becoming the first-ever cyber clinic to offer online consultation to over 4.5 lakh patients every year. Dr. Mukesh Batra studied at the Campion School in Mumbai and later at Jai Hind College. At the age of 60, he enrolled at Harvard University for a management course in best practices in healthcare. He established the Dr Batra's Positive Health Foundation in 2001 that benefits the community at large

Early life and education
Both of Dr. Mukesh Batra's parents were doctors. His mother was an allopath and his father was a homeopath. Dr. Mukesh Batra was born in Lucknow. He lived in Agra before moving to Mumbai later. He went on to earn his homeopathy degree from the Bombay Homeopathic Medical College (Smt. Chandaben Mohanbhai Patel Homeopathic Medical College) in 1972.

Career
Dr. Mukesh Batra started his career in 1974 at a charitable homeopathy clinic in Malabar Hill. Having made a tough career decision to join homeopathy, he struggled for the first 9 years at a salary of Rs. 150/- per month.

Dr. Batra later decided to initiate a private practice in a polyclinic that was near. After two years, Dr. Mukesh Batra started his own clinic- known as Positive Health clinic in the Chowpatty area in South Mumbai with a bank loan at an exorbitant 36% interest in 1982. He treated over 300 patients a day including heads of states, film stars, politicians, industrialists. In 1996, he set up the first International clinic in Mauritius. In Mauritius, he worked at legislating for the system of homeopathy and Dr Batra’s clinic is the first and one of the recognized homeopathic clinics in the country. In the Middle East, he introduced homeopathy in countries that prohibit use of alcohol-based medicines on religious grounds. Dr Mukesh has played an instrumental role in spreading homeopathy in places like Mauritius, Muscat and London. In 2018, Batra spoke about a new line of treatment called ‘Geno Homeopathy’ which is claimed to be a combination of genetics and homeopathy.

Hundreds of clinics are opened in India. Batra's Homeopathic Clinic (FZ-LLC) is present at the Dubai Healthcare City in Dubai followed by another clinic in Jumeirah Lake Towers. Other than Dubai, the clinics are available in Abu Dhabi, London, Dhaka.

Philanthropy
Batra's company sponsors the annual Dr Batra's Positive Health Awards to honor people who fight against disease and disability and he donates the proceeds of his annual photography exhibit for charitable causes. Batra has over 160 free clinics across India for homeopathy and provides free treatment to their partnered NGO's - Victoria Memorial School for the Blind, Shepherd Widows Home, Mercy Old Age Home, Sandhya Home for the Aged, Little Sisters of Poor (located in Hyderabad, Bangalore and Chennai), Ek Prayaas and Kartar Aasra Home through its CSR initiative called Dr Batra's Foundation.

Awards and recognition
 Person of the Year in healthcare at the World Today Business Conclave 2016
 Lifetime Achievement Award for his service in homeopathy by World Medical Council (2014)
 1st Sheikh Zayed International Awards For TCAM 2020 ceremony

References

Indian homeopaths
1951 births
Living people
Businesspeople from Mumbai
Recipients of the Padma Shri in medicine